Hannu Himanen (born 1951) is a Finnish diplomat. He was the Finnish Ambassador to Russia in Moscow from 1 May 2012 to August 2016 and retired shortly after the post to Moscow.

Biography
Himanen acted as the Finnish Ambassador and Permanent Representative to the United Nations and other international organizations and to the World Trade Organization in the WTO in Geneva, from 2008 to 2012.

Himanen graduated in 1976 as a Bachelor of Social Sciences from the University of Tampere with a major degree in Information Science. He started with the Ministry for Foreign Affairs 1976. Between 1996 and 2000 he was the Ambassador of Finland in Jakarta. Between 2000 and 2001, he was Director General for Africa and the Middle East at the Ministry for Foreign Affairs, 2001–2002 at the EastWest Institute for Security and Good Governance at the Prague Center and 2002–2003 as Foreign Affairs Counselor at the Ministry for Foreign Affairs Research and Planning.

In 2003–2008, Himanen was under-secretary to the State Department.

References 

Ambassadors of Finland to Indonesia
Ambassadors of Finland to Russia
Permanent Representatives of Finland to the United Nations
1951 births
Living people